Claus Gehrke (born 6 April 1942) is a German biathlete. He competed in the relay event at the 1976 Winter Olympics.

References

1942 births
Living people
German male biathletes
Olympic biathletes of West Germany
Biathletes at the 1976 Winter Olympics
Sportspeople from Berlin